State Route 300 (SR 300, also called the Georgia–Florida Parkway), is a  state highway in the southern part of the U.S. state of Georgia. Its southern terminus is at the Florida state line south-southeast of Thomasville, where the roadway continues as US 19/SR 57. This is also the southern terminus of SR 3, with which US 19 and SR 300 travel concurrently through the southern part of the state. Its northern terminus is at Interstate 75 (I-75) in Cordele.

This is the second state route in Georgia to carry the SR 300 designation.

Route description

Florida to Albany

SR 300 begins at the Florida state line, where it is concurrent with US 19. On the Florida side of the state line, US 19 is concurrent with Florida State Road 57 (SR 57, which is unsigned), and is known as the Florida–Georgia Parkway. At the state line, SR 3 and SR 300 begin. US 19/SR 3/SR 300 head northwest until they enter Thomasville. In the city, they intersect US 84/SR 38, which head east to Valdosta. Here, they join the concurrency. Also, this intersection marks the eastern terminus of US 84 Business/SR 38 Business. Farther to the northwest, the five routes intersect US 319/SR 35, where US 84/SR 38 depart to the west, along with SR 3 Alternate (SR 3 Alt.). In Meigs, SR 111 intersects the concurrency, along with the northern terminus of SR 3 Alt. In Camilla, the highways have intersections with SR 37 and SR 112, and curve to make a slight jog to the northeast until they reach Albany.

Albany to Cordele
Most of the route of SR 300 in Albany is on the Liberty Expressway, a freeway-grade bypass of the city's downtown to the northeast. In the southeastern part of the city is an intersection with SR 133, which joins the concurrency, and the eastern terminus of SR 234. Nearly  later, the concurrency intersects US 19 Bus./US 82 Bus./SR 520 Bus., where US 19 Bus. has its southern terminus. Slightly later is US 82/SR 520. It travels through rural areas until it reaches the Cordele area. Just before entering Cordele proper is SR 300 Connector and US 41/SR 7. Upon entering Cordele, the route meets its northern terminus, an interchange with I-75.

History

1920s
The roadway that would eventually become the current SR 300 was established in 1920 as SR 3 from Thomasville to Albany, via Camilla. By October 1926, nearly all of the aforementioned route was paved. By October 1929, SR 3 was extended southwest to where US 319 currently crosses the state line. US 19 was designated along this route to Thomasville, and then its current route from Thomasville to Albany. SR 35 was designated along a portion of highway that is the current route of US 19 from the Florida state line to Thomasville.

1930s
By 1935, nearly all of the northern half of the section of SR 35 between the Florida state line and Thomasville was paved. Prior to the beginning of 1936, nearly all of that section of SR 35 was paved. By July, the rest of that section was paved. In March 1937, the section of SR 300 that currently travels from Albany to Cordele was established as a northern extension of SR 133. By October the routings of the portions of US 19 southwest of Thomasville was shifted to its current routing, while SR 3 stayed on its original routing. The following August, a small portion of SR 133 southwest of Cordele was paved.

1940s
By 1944, a very brief section of SR 133 northeast of Albany was paved. In early 1946, approximately half of the length of SR 133 between Warwick and Cordele was paved. In early 1948, all of SR 133 was redesignated as SR 257. The section of SR 257 from Albany to the intersection with SR 32 and the section from Lake Blackshear to Cordele were paved. In 1950, nearly all of SR 257 was paved.

1950s to 1980s
By 1952, the entire roadway that would eventually become SR 300 was paved. A section of the highway from Albany to Cordele was proposed as Interstate 175 and then cancelled, but in early 1982, the Georgia–Florida Parkway was approved to be designated along the entire stretch of what is now SR 300. By the next year, all of SR 257 was redesignated as SR 300 and the designation was applied to the rest of its current route. Later that year, the routings of SR 3 and SR 35 south of Thomasville were swapped.

Major intersections

Cordele connector route

State Route 300 Connector (SR 300 Conn.) is a  connector route of the SR 300 mainline that exists entirely within Crisp County. It follows Old Albany Highway from an intersection with SR 300 southwest of Cordele and travels northeast until it meets its northern terminus, an intersection with US 280/SR 30 west of the city.

See also

References

External links

 
 Georgia Roads (Routes 281 - 300)
 Georgia State Route 300 on State-Ends.com
 Interstate 175 Georgia on Kurumi.com

300
Transportation in Thomas County, Georgia
Transportation in Mitchell County, Georgia
Transportation in Dougherty County, Georgia
Transportation in Worth County, Georgia
Transportation in Crisp County, Georgia